Gora is a rural locality (a village) in Vsevolodo-Vilvenskoye Urban Settlement, Alexandrovsky District, Perm Krai, Russia. The population was 3 as of 2010. There are 2 streets.

Geography 
Gora is located 4 km west of Alexandrovsk (the district's administrative centre) by road.

References 

Rural localities in Alexandrovsky District